Kamiak High School  is a public high school in Mukilteo, Washington, United States. It was the second high school in the Mukilteo School District when it opened on September 8, 1993. The first and only high school within Mukilteo city limits, it was built to accommodate overflow population from the overcrowded Mariner High School in the neighboring city of Everett.

Kamiak's campus features over 40 classrooms, a physical education complex with two separate gymnasiums and a weight room, a half-Olympic sized swimming pool complex, a Performing Arts Center (known as "The PAC"), a number of portables, six tennis courts, a softball field, baseball field, soccer field, football field, track facilities, and the school's East Campus, which houses science and math rooms as well as a third gymnasium (Multi-Purpose room) used as a secondary cafeteria.

History
When Mariner High School opened on January 10, 1971, it was the only high school serving the Mukilteo School District. While the district waited for 84 years before opening Mariner, it dealt with substantial growth in enrollment between the openings of Mariner and Kamiak; from 1982 to 1992, the district student count had grown by 84 percent, with the district building one school per year from 1984 onward. With the growth far outstripping available capacity at Mariner, it was apparent that an additional high school was needed to handle future secondary students.

Construction of Kamiak was initially funded via a $66.7 million levy approved by voters in 1989; an additional $89.5 million was approved in 1992. The cost of construction was projected at $32 million, with another $13 million dedicated to the construction of the adjacent Harbour Pointe Middle School. The opening of both schools was threatened by contract negotiations between the district and its teachers, but a potential strike was averted when both sides agreed to a three-year contract; both schools opened as planned on September 8, 1993. Kamiak opened without a senior class for the 1993–94 school year.

Firecrackers
On November 23, 2015, Kamiak was involved in a school shooting scare when it was put under lockdown after a teacher called 9-1-1 around 9:38 AM, reporting that she heard gunshots near her third-floor classroom. Neighboring schools Columbia Elementary and Harbour Pointe Middle were also placed under lockdown as a precaution. Mukilteo police responded to the scene with assistance from multiple law enforcement agencies, which included the Washington State Patrol and the Snohomish County Sheriff's Office as well as the police departments of Edmonds, Everett, Lynnwood, and Mill Creek; an Everett officer was involved in a rear-end collision with another driver on SR 526 at its eastern terminus while responding to the incident. Officers at the scene found residue from two firecrackers in a stairwell between the second and third floors, conducting a full sweep of the campus after the discovery. The lockdown was lifted around 1:10 PM, lasting more than three hours in duration.

Joshua O'Connor
Just more than two years later, Kamiak was involved in another shooting scare when former student Joshua Alexander O'Connor was arrested on February 13, 2018, in connection with a plot to shoot up ACES Alternative High, his then-current school. O'Connor's initial target in the plot was Kamiak, where he was suspended twice while attending there; he later switched his target to ACES after conducting a coin flip to decide between the two schools. O'Connor was ultimately thwarted when his grandmother discovered the plot while going through his journal and called 9-1-1 to report it; he pled guilty to all charges brought against him on December 7 and was subsequently sentenced to 22½ years in prison on February 28, 2019.

Notable alumni
 Jean-Luc Baker (2012), ice dancer and Olympian
 Sean Beighton (2007), Olympic curling coach and former curler
 Ron Watkins (2005), conspiracy theorist, former 8chan administrator, and alleged author of QAnon posts
 Andrew Forsman (2004), drummer and percussionist for the progressive rock band The Fall of Troy
 Thomas Erak (2003), lead vocalist, guitarist, and keyboardist for the band The Fall of Troy, which formed during their time at Kamiak
 Tim Ward (2003), bass guitarist and screamed vocalist for the progressive rock band The Fall of Troy, which produced a single for Guitar Hero III: Legends of Rock
 Marko Liias (1999), Democratic member of the Washington State Senate, representing the 21st legislative district

Notable faculty
Chance McKinney (until 2010), Country musician and winner of CMT's Music City Madness Competition

Academics
The school offers 22 Advanced Placement courses: Calculus AB, Calculus BC, Statistics, English Language and Composition, English Literature and Composition, Computer Science, Biology, Chemistry, Physics C: Mechanics, Physics C: Electricity and Magnetism, European History, Human Geography, US Government and Politics, World History, US History, Spanish Language and Culture, French Language and Culture, German Language and Culture, Japanese Language and Culture, Music Theory, Studio Art: 2D Design Portfolio, and Studio Art: Drawing Portfolio, as well as a number of honors courses.

Athletics
The school is part of District One of the Washington Interscholastic Activities Association (WIAA). With over 2,000 students enrolled, Kamiak is classified as a Wesco 4A member under WIAA guidelines. Their main rival in athletics is Mariner High School, the other high school in the Mukilteo School District. Sports offered include:

 Freshmen and Varsity Football
 Girls' JV and Varsity Soccer
 Girls' Swim
 Girls' Dive
 Girls' Freshmen, JV, and Varsity Volleyball
 Cross Country
 Boys' JV and Varsity Tennis
 Boys' Freshmen, JV, and Varsity Basketball
 Girls' Freshmen, JV, and Varsity Basketball
 Wrestling
 Boys' Swim
 Boys' Dive
 Boys' JV and Varsity Baseball
 Girls' JV and Varsity Softball
 Boys' and Girls' Track
 Girls' JV and Varsity Tennis
 Boys' JV and Varsity Soccer
 Boys' Varsity Golf
 Girls' JV and Varsity Golf
 Flag Football
 Dance
 Cheerleading
 Hip Hop
 Boys' and Girls' Lacrosse JV & Varsity [Club sport]
Marching/Show Band

Clubs and activities

Art
Tri-M
Asian
Newspaper (The Kamiak Gauntlet)
Spanish
Knights in Action
Leadership
Chess
German
Debate
Fashion
Robotics
DECA
Korean
Drama
Marching/Show Band
Winter Percussion
Color Guard
Winter Guard

See also 

 List of high schools in Washington (state)
2016 Mukilteo shooting

References

External links 
 

1993 establishments in Washington (state)
Educational institutions established in 1993
High schools in Snohomish County, Washington
Public high schools in Washington (state)